Schlarman is a surname. Notable people with the surname include:

 John Schlarman (1975–2020), American football offensive line coach
 Joseph Henry Leo Schlarman (1879–1951), American prelate of the Roman Catholic Church
 Stanley Girard Schlarman (born 1933), American prelate of the Roman Catholic Church

See also
 Schlarman Academy, Roman Catholic school